Synopsia sociaria is a moth of the family Geometridae. It is found from the southern part of central Europe to western Central Asia. In the north, the range extends from the North Sea coast to the Baltic region and Russia. In the Caucasus, subspecies S. sociaria unitaria is found.

The wingspan is 28–34 mm. In the southern part of the range, adults are on wing from the end of March to the beginning of June and again from the beginning of July to the beginning of October in two generations per year. North of the Alps, there is only one generation per year with adults on wing from July to August.

The larvae feed on various plant, including Genista, Artemisia, Echium and Erica species. Pupation occurs on the ground between moss.

Subspecies
Synopsia sociaria sociaria
Synopsia sociaria unitaria (Staudinger, 1870) (Caucasus)

Synopsia sociaria propinquaria from Corsica is sometimes treated as a valid subspecies.

References

External links

Lepiforum.de

Moths described in 1799
Boarmiini
Moths of Europe
Moths of Asia
Taxa named by Jacob Hübner